This is a list of members of the House of Representatives of the 46th Parliament of Australia (2019–2022).

Members

Leadership

Presiding officer

Coalition Government leadership

Labor Opposition leadership

Partisan mix of the House by state and territory

Notes

References

Members of Australian parliaments by term
21st-century Australian politicians
Australian House of Representatives, List of members of
2010s politics-related lists